Diana Marion Maxwell, Baroness Farnham,  ( Gunnis; 24 May 1931 – 29 December 2021) was a British courtier who served as Lady of the Bedchamber to Queen Elizabeth II from 1987 until her death in 2021.

Biography

Born Diana Marion Gunnis on 24 May 1931, she was the elder daughter of Nigel Eric Murray Gunnis, of Branden, Sissinghurst, Kent. In 1959, she married Barry Maxwell, 12th Baron Farnham. They adopted two daughters, Harriet and Sophia.

Lady Farnham was named a Lady of the Bedchamber to Queen Elizabeth II on 4 August 1987 upon the retirement of Patricia Nevill, Marchioness of Abergavenny. Owing to her connections to Ireland, Lady Farnham accompanied The Queen on her landmark state visit to the Republic of Ireland in 2011. In 2012, during the Diamond Jubilee, she notably rode alongside The Queen to St Paul's Cathedral for the Service of Thanksgiving after Prince Philip, Duke of Edinburgh, was hospitalized.

Lord and Lady Farnham donated the Farnham collection of photographs, mementos, letters, war medals and papers relating to the Farnham family and their connection to County Cavan to the Cavan County Museum and the National Library of Ireland.

She died on 29 December 2021 at the age of 90. Her funeral was held in the Chapel Royal, St James's Palace, on 14 January 2022. Dame Mary Morrison represented The Queen, and the Duke and Duchess of Gloucester attended. Her ashes are to be interred in Kilmore Cathedral at a later date.

Honours
  Royal Victorian Order:
 1 January 1998: Commander (CVO)
 12 June 2010: Dame Commander (DCVO)

References

1931 births
2021 deaths
British baronesses
Ladies of the Bedchamber
Dames Commander of the Royal Victorian Order